The 2014 Pan-American Volleyball Cup was the thirteenth edition of the annual women's volleyball tournament, played by twelve countries over June, 2014 in Mexico City, Mexico.

The Dominican Republic defeated 3–1 to the United States to win their third competition's gold medal. Among the NORCECA, the USA team was already qualified to the FIVB World Grand Prix as wild cards, while the Dominican Republic qualified to the 2015 group I, Puerto Rico, Cuba and Canada to the group II and Mexico will play the 2015 FIVB World Grand Prix group III. Brazil as wild card was already qualified to the group I while Argentina qualified to the group II and Colombia will play the group III.

Competing nations

 * Brazil withdrew from the competition two days before the start. Their matches were not removed from the competition, rathered not played and considered nule games.

Pool standing procedure
Match ending 3–0: 5 points for the winner, 0 point for the loser
Match ending 3–1: 4 points for the winner, 1 points for the loser
Match ending 3–2: 3 points for the winner, 2 points for the loser
In case of tie, the teams will be classified according to the following criteria:
points ratio (first criteria) and sets ratio (second criteria)

Preliminary round

Group A

Note: Mexico finished with a 3–2 record and 9 points and placed fourth behind Cuba (3–2, 15 points) and in front of Peru (1–4, 10 points).

Group B

Final round

Championship bracket

7th to 10th places bracket

Classification 7–10

Quarterfinals

Classification 9–10

Classification 7–8

Semifinals

Classification 5–6

Classification 3–4

Final

Final standing

Individual awards

Most Valuable Player
  Brenda Castillo
Best Setter
  María Marín
Best Outside Hitters
  Bethania de la Cruz
  Margarita Martínez
Best Middle Blockers
  Cándida Arias
  TeTori Dixon
Best Opposite
  Andrea Rangel
Best Libero
  Brenda Castillo

References

Women's Pan-American Volleyball Cup
Pan-American Volleyball Cup
Women's Pan-American Volleyball Cup
2014 Women's Pan-American Volleyball Cup
2014 in Mexican women's sports